Carl Baker (born 3 January 1982) is a British former professional boxer who competed from 2003 to 2014.

Professional career
Baker made his professional debut on 6 September 2003, stopping Dave Clarke in the first round. The highlight of Baker's career was competing in the heavyweight edition of the Prizefighter series on 2 October 2009. He entered the tournament as an outsider, but defeated one of the favourites—Danny Williams—by unanimous decision (UD) in the opening round, while also scoring two knockdowns against Williams in the first round of their fight. In the semi-final, Baker was eliminated after losing a UD to Coleman Barrett.

Professional boxing record

References

External links

1982 births
Sportspeople from Sheffield
Living people
English male boxers
Heavyweight boxers
Prizefighter contestants
Southpaw boxers